Joey Tempest is the third solo album by Joey Tempest, the vocalist in the Swedish hard rock band Europe. It was released on 21 October 2002.

Three songs were co-written by Europe keyboardist Mic Michaeli.

Track listing
 "Forgiven" – 4:00 (Joey Tempest / Malcolm Pardon / Fredrik Rinman)
 "Loved by Me" – 3:46 (Tempest / Pardon / Rinman / Mic Michaeli)
 "Sometimes" – 3:57 (Tempest / Pardon / Rinman / Adam Lamprell / Kajsa Ribbing)
 "Losers" – 3:10 (Tempest / Lamprell)
 "Superhuman" – 3:38 (Tempest / Lamprell)
 "Always on the Run" – 3:32 (Tempest / Pardon / Rinman / Lamprell)
 "Outside Heaven" – 3:56 (Tempest / Pardon / Rinman)
 "Magnificent" – 2:20 (Tempest / Lamprell)
 "Dreamless" – 3:37 (Tempest / Michaeli)
 "Every Universe" – 4:10 (Tempest / Chris Difford)
 "Falling Apart" – 3:39 (Tempest / Pardon / Rinman / Ribbing)
 "Don't Change" – 3:23 (Tempest / Michaeli)
 "Kill for a Girl Like You" [bonus track] – 4:08
 "Kicking Around" [bonus track] – 3:41

Personnel
Joey Tempest – lead vocals, guitars, bass
Adam Lamprell – guitars
Malcolm Pardon – guitars, bass
Fredrik Rinman – guitars, keyboards
Jörgen Wall – drums

Production
DeadMono – producer
Ronny Lahti – mixing, additional recordings
Ted Jensen - mastering
WalseCustomDesign - sleeve
Peter Alendahl/Skarp - photography

References 

Joey Tempest albums
2002 albums